Alexandre Ganoczy (born Sándor Gánóczy; 12 December 1928 in Budapest) is a Hungarian Catholic theologian and writer.

Selected works 
Le jeune Calvin : Genèse et évolution de sa vocation réformatrice, Wiesbaden : F. Steiner 1966
Einführung in die katholische Sakramentenlehre, Wiss. Buchges., 1979

References 

1928 births
Living people
Hungarian Roman Catholic theologians
Hungarian writers